Sibak may refer to:
 Sibak, Chaharmahal and Bakhtiari
 Sibak, Isfahan
 Sibak, see Glossary of Wing Chun terms#Family Lineage Titles or Terms